Park Wood or Parkwood is a housing estate and district in Gillingham at the south-eastern corner of the Medway conurbation in Kent, England. It was built mainly during the 1960s and 1970s, largely by Ward Homes, and originally called Rainham Park.

Parkwood is bordered by Wigmore to the west, Rainham to the north, and the M2 motorway to the south. It is within the Rainham South council ward.

References

Medway